Argyrotaenia isolatissima is a species of moth of the family Tortricidae. It is found in the United States, where it has been recorded from California.

Adults have been recorded on wing in May.

The larvae feed on Coreopsis species.

References

isolatissima
Endemic fauna of California
Fauna of the California chaparral and woodlands
Moths of North America
Moths described in 1964